Jacob Pleydell-Bouverie, 8th Earl of Radnor (10 November 1927 – 10 August 2008) was a British nobleman. He was the son of William Pleydell-Bouverie, 7th Earl of Radnor and Helena Olivia Adeane.

He married, firstly, Anne Garden Seth-Smith, daughter of Donald Farquaharson Seth-Smith, on 8 July 1953 and they were divorced in 1962. He and Anne had two sons: 
     
William Pleydell-Bouverie, 9th Earl of Radnor (b. 5 January 1955) 
Hon. Peter John Pleydell-Bouverie DL (b. 14 January 1958), married Hon. Jane Victoria Gilmour (b. 1959), daughter of Ian Gilmour, Baron Gilmour of Craigmillar, in 1986 and had issue.

He married, secondly, Margaret Robin Fleming, daughter of Robin Fleming, in 1963 and they were divorced in 1985. They had four daughters:

Lady Martha Pleydell-Bouverie (b. 1964)
Lady Lucy Pleydell-Bouverie (b. 1964)
Lady Belinda Pleydell-Bouverie (b. 1966) whose husband died recently.
Lady Frances Pleydell-Bouverie (b. 1973)

He married, thirdly, Mary Jillean Gwenellan Eddy, daughter of William Edward Montague Eddy, in 1986. He died at Longford Castle in 2008.

From 1971 to 2008 he served as Governor of the French Hospital in Rochester, Kent. Successive Earls of Radnor were governors of the hospital from the eighteenth century to 2015.

Notes

Ancestry

External links

1927 births
2008 deaths
Earls of Radnor
Radnor